Gordonia lacunae is a bacterium from the genus Gordonia which has been isolated from soil from the Plettenberg Bay in South Africa.

References

External links
Type strain of Gordonia lacunae at BacDive -  the Bacterial Diversity Metadatabase	

Mycobacteriales
Bacteria described in 2009